Augustus Austen Leigh (1840–1905) was the 32nd provost of King's College, Cambridge. Born at Scarlets, Berkshire, he entered King's College, in 1859, where earned the members' prize in 1862, and graduated with an M.A. in 1866. He was appointed a tutor at the college from 1868 to 1881, and was dean from 1871 to 1873 and 1882–5, and vice-provost from 1877 to 1889. He succeeded Richard Okes as provost on 9 February 1889. He held various other positions, including president of the Cambridge University Musical Society from 1883, and president of Cambridge University Cricket Club from 1886 to 1904.

References

External links
 
 

Provosts of King's College, Cambridge
1840 births
1905 deaths
People from Wargrave